Mallinatha may refer to:

 Mallinātha Sūri, more commonly known simply as Mallinātha, commentator on major Sanskrit works
 Māllīnātha, a Jain tirthankara